The 2009 Iowa State Cyclones football team represented Iowa State University in the 2009 NCAA Division I FBS football season. The team was led by first year head coach Paul Rhoads. They played their home games at Jack Trice Stadium in Ames, Iowa. The Cyclones finished the season 7–6, 3–5 in Big 12 play and beat Minnesota 14–13 in the Insight Bowl.

Before the season

Recruiting

Schedule

Roster

Game summaries

Iowa

at Nebraska

The Cyclones entered Memorial Stadium without their leading quarterback and rushing threat and subsequently played an error-free game. The solid effort was enough to put up 9 points in the first half to lead Nebraska by 2, which concluded the game's scoring. The 9 points turned out to be sufficient to win against the poor Cornhusker offensive effort, which turned over the ball a school-record eight times (including four inside of Iowa State's five-yard line). The turnovers negated Nebraska's 362–239 edge in yards gained.

The Cyclones enjoyed their first win in Memorial Stadium since 1977. First-year Head coach Paul Rhoads said about the game, "When you don't win in a stadium on the road since 1977, it's big."

vs. Minnesota (Insight Bowl)

Statistics

Team

Scores by quarter

Offense

Rushing

Passing

Receiving

Defense

Special teams

After the season

Awards

Big 12 player of the week
Alexander RobinsonOn September 28, Alexander Robinson was declared the Big 12 Co-Offensive player of the week after recording 178 yards of total offense and three touchdowns in Iowa State's win over Army.  Robinson is the first Iowa State running back since Ennis Haywood in 2000 to record three consecutive 100- yard games.

References

Iowa State
Iowa State Cyclones football seasons
Guaranteed Rate Bowl champion seasons
Iowa State Cyclones football